The 31st Legislative Assembly of British Columbia sat from 1976 to 1979. The members were elected in the British Columbia general election held in December 1975. The Social Credit Party led by Bill Bennett formed the government. The New Democratic Party (NDP) led by William Stewart King formed the official opposition. Dave Barrett had lost his seat in the election; he was reelected in a by-election held in June 1976 and resumed his role as party leader.

Dean Smith served as speaker for the assembly until 1978 when he resigned as speaker. Harvey Schroeder replaced Smith as speaker in 1979.

Members of the 31st General Assembly 
The following members were elected to the assembly in 1975:

Notes:

Party standings

By-elections 
By-elections were held to replace members for various reasons:

Notes:
Two by-elections were called in 1979 for the ridings of North Vancouver-Seymour and North Vancouver-Capilano but they were cancelled when a 1979 general election was scheduled.

References 

Political history of British Columbia
Terms of British Columbia Parliaments
1976 establishments in British Columbia
1979 disestablishments in British Columbia
20th century in British Columbia